Jiang Guiti (1844 – January 16, 1922) was a Chinese general who served under Song Qing in the suppression of the Taiping and Nian rebels and later against the Empire of Japan. He was a warlord during the warlord era and the de facto ruler of Rehe province until its conquest by the fengtain clique.

References

1844 births
1922 deaths
Qing dynasty generals
Generals from Anhui
Politicians from Bozhou
Republic of China warlords from Anhui
Empire of China (1915–1916)